Beryozovsky is a rural locality (a settlement) in Druzhbinsky Selsoviet, Aleysky District, Altai Krai, Russia. The population was 2 as of 2012. There are 2 streets.

Geography 
Beryozovsky is located 40 km WNW of Aleysk (the district's administrative centre) by road. Druzhba and Mokhovskoye are the nearest rural localities.

References 

Rural localities in Aleysky District